The Mark Riley Show is a weekday radio show on the Air America Radio network hosted by long-time talk radio host Mark Riley.

Background
Originally it was part of a larger Air America Mornings program, but as of September 18, 2006 the show was billed on its own.  The show features news items read by Riley and his commentary on each of them.  Riley interviews a wide variety of guests, though these segments are often pre-recorded due to the early airtime of the show.  Riley often takes listener calls on a specific topic in a rapid-fire fashion.

The show began on January 2, 2006, originally airing weekdays from 5AM - 7AM ET.  It now airs on weekdays from 5AM - 6AM ET on some Air America affiliates.

The show came to an end on May 11, 2007.

Regular features 
 Sunrise Soundbites - audio clips from some of yesterdays important news stories
 Last Night's Clips - audio clips from the late-night television comedy shows
 Overseas Live - Riley talks with an overseas reporter on the day's major international story
 On the Grapevine - entertainment news
 Nice Try of the Week - a political figure's failed attempt to justify their actions
 Weekly Conversation with Robert Reich - Riley and Reich discuss the week's economic news
 Winners and Losers - Friday roundup
 Wayne Gillman - the morning AAR newscaster joins the show during the second hour
 Common Sense Commentary - Jim Hightower's daily commentary
 The Numbers - A list of numerical facts similar to Harper's Index

Music 
 Theme: "Float On" by Modest Mouse
 Bumpers: various jazz tunes

Staff 
 Host: Mark Riley
 Producer: Ron Dodd
 Producer: John Crimmings
 Sports reporter: Larry Hardesty
 Sound Engineer: Kris Lo Presto

External links 
 

Air America (radio network)
American talk radio programs